Aesthetothrips is a genus of thrips in the family Phlaeothripidae.

Species
 Aesthetothrips tucuche

References

Phlaeothripidae
Thrips genera